.tw is the Internet country code top-level domain (ccTLD) for Taiwan. The domain name is based on the ISO 3166-1 alpha-2 country code TW. The registry is maintained by the Taiwan Network Information Center (TWNIC), a Taiwanese non-profit organization appointed by the National Communications Commission (NCC) and the Ministry of Transportation and Communication. Since 1 March 2001, TWNIC has stopped allowing itself to sign up new domain names directly, instead allowing new registration through its contracted reseller registrars.

The current reseller registrars are as follows: Chunghwa Telecom, Chunghwa Int'l Communication Network Co., Ltd., FarEasTone, Taiwan Mobile, Asia Pacific Telecom, PC Home, Net-Chinese, TISNet, IP Mirror, Webnic, Neulevel.

Registering .tw website domains

Internationalized ccTLDs
ICANN assigned two Internationalized country code top-level domains (IDN ccTLDs) for Taiwan on 25 June 2010:

   : taiwan in traditional Chinese characters (DNS name: xn--kpry57d)
   : taiwan in simplified Chinese characters (DNS name: xn--kprw13d)
Presently in November 2019, and since at least November 2015, the simplified suffix is a DNAME alias for the traditional suffix.  As a result any subdomain of the traditional xn--kpry57d TLD automatically has a CNAME alias from the simplified xn--kprw13d TLD. The traditional suffix is in active use.

Second-Level Domains
Registrations under  are possible in second-level space or under various domains as third-level domains:

 : for educational and academic institutions
 : for agencies of the Government of the Republic of China, operated by Taiwan
 : for the Republic of China Armed Forces, operated by Taiwan
 : for companies or firms (Taiwanese or foreign) registered under the laws of their country
 : for network or telecommunications license holders
 : for non-profit organizations (Taiwanese or foreign) established according to the laws of their country
 : for individuals (must verify their identity by e-mail)
 : unrestricted (but registrant must verify their identity by email), intended for gaming-related content
 : unrestricted (but registrant must verify their identity by email), intended for online business-related content
 : unrestricted (but registrant must verify their identity by email)
 : unrestricted

Domain names in Chinese characters may also be registered at the second level. Furthermore, any registrant of a standard domain name who has chosen a domestic registrar may automatically get two more domain names in Chinese characters in the following second-level domains: 網路.tw, 組織.tw and 商業.tw.

Statistics 

As of March 2017, around 8.31％ of the .tw domains are served via secured HTTPS protocol, with the cPanel, Inc. Certification Authority being the most popular SSL certificate. Apache is the most popular web server, serving 47.60% of the .tw domains, followed by Microsoft-IIS serving 20.31% of the total .tw domains.

See also 

.cn (China)
 .jp (Japan)
 .kr (South Korea)

References

External links
 .TW Whois Service
 IANA .tw whois information
 List of registrars accredited by TWNIC
 List of registrars accredited by Neulevel

Country code top-level domains
Telecommunications in Taiwan
Internet in Taiwan
1989 establishments in Taiwan
Internet properties established in 1989
Computer-related introductions in 1989

sv:Toppdomän#T